The Archdiocesan Chancery is a heritage house in the City of San Fernando, Pampanga. It was the former residence of Luis Wenceslao Dison and Felisa Hizon that was purchased by the Roman Catholic Archdiocese of San Fernando. It is now being used as the Archdiocesan Chancery.

Cultural Properties of the Philippines
Buildings and structures in San Fernando, Pampanga
Landmarks in the Philippines
Heritage Houses in the Philippines